Michael Wong Wai-lun, JP (born 1962) is a Hong Kong government official who has been Deputy Financial Secretary since 2022.

Early life 
Wong received a Bachelor of Social Sciences Degree from the University of Hong Kong and a Bachelor of Laws Degree from the University of London (External Programme).

Career 
He joined the Administrative Service in August 1985. He served in many bureaux and departments, including the City and New Territories Administration, the Television and Entertainment Licensing Authority, the Legal Department, the Central Policy Unit, the former Trade and Industry Branch, the Business and Services Promotion Unit, the Economic Services Bureau, the Security Bureau and the former Economic Development and Labour Bureau.

He was promoted to the Deputy Secretary for Education in July 2007 and the Director of Information Services in 2009. he rose to the rank of Administrative Officer Staff Grade A in April 2011. He became the Director of Marine in 2014 and Permanent Secretary for Development (Planning and Lands) in 2015.

He was appointed to the Secretary for Development in July 2017 of Chief Executive Carrie Lam's administration.

In October 2022, after John Lee's policy address, Wong was asked about criticism that the government was playing with numbers and introducing a new index to give the appearance of lower public housing wait times, and Wong dismissed such criticism.

Personal life 
Wong married May Chan Wing-shiu, also a civil servant, in 2008. As of January 2022, Chan was one of the deputy secretaries for Financial Services & the Treasury.

In November 2022, Wong tested positive for COVID-19.

References 

1962 births
Living people
Government officials of Hong Kong
Hong Kong civil servants
Alumni of the University of Hong Kong
Alumni of the University of London